Unlucky Boy is the sixth studio album by the blues band Chicken Shack, released in 1973.

Track listing

Side one
"You Know You Could Be Right" (Stan Webb) – 3:47
"Revelation" (Webb) – 5:13
"Prudence's Party" (Webb) – 3:14
"Too Late to Cry" (Lonnie Johnson) – 3:10
"Stan the Man" (Webb) – 4:25

Side two
"Unlucky Boy" (Big Mama Thornton, William Dupree) – 2:34
"As Time Goes Passing By" (Webb) – 4:46
"Jammin' with Ash" (Webb) – 7:04
"He Knows the Rules" (Jimmy McCracklin) – 4:05

CD bonus tracks
"As Time Goes Passing By" [Single version] – 3:33
"Hear Me Cry" – 3:55
"Think" – 2:16
"It's Easy" – 4:55
"Doctor Brown" – 3:01

ABOVE TRACKS 3 TO 5 from Stan Webb's Chicken Shack – The Creeper (1978)
Bass Guitar – Paul Martinez
Drums – Ed Spevock
Engineer – Manfred Neuner
Guitar – Robbie Blunt
Guitar, Vocals – Stan Webb
Keyboards, Producer – Tony Ashton
Tenor Saxophone, Soprano Saxophone – Dave Winthrop
Notes: Recorded at Tonstudio Hiltpoltstein (West) Germany Nov/Dec 1977.

Personnel
Stan Webb – guitar, vocals
Bob Daisley – bass guitar
Tony Ashton – piano
Paul Hancox – drums, percussion
Chris Mercer – saxophones
Terry Noonan - string arrangements

Additional personnel
John Burns - Engineer, remixing
Anton Matthews - Engineer
Neil Slaven - Liner notes, producer
David Wedgbury - Photography

References

1973 albums
Chicken Shack albums
Deram Records albums
albums recorded at Olympic Sound Studios